Medium-density polyethylene (MDPE) is a type of polyethylene defined by a density range of 0.926–0.940 g/cm3. It is less dense than HDPE, which is more common.

MDPE can be produced by chromium/silica catalysts, Ziegler-Natta catalysts or metallocene catalysts. MDPE has good shock and drop resistance properties. It also is less notch sensitive than HDPE. Stress cracking resistance is better than that of HDPE. MDPE is typically used in gas pipes and fittings, sacks, shrink film, packaging film, carrier bags, and screw closures.

In the United Kingdom, black (or blue) MDPE is often used for water and waste water plumbing, and may also be referred to as 'black alkathene.'

See also
 Cross-linked polyethylene (PEX)
 Low-density polyethylene (LDPE)
 Linear low-density polyethylene (LLDPE)
 High-density polyethylene (HDPE)
 Ultra-high-molecular-weight polyethylene (UHMWPE)
 Stretch wrap
 Plastic recycling
 Electrofusion

References

External links
Medium Density Polyethylene Specialty Rinse Tanks
MDPE UK Supplier

Polyolefins
Plastics
Packaging materials